Siwi Boora is an Indian boxer who competes in the lightweight  weight class.  she has won a gold medal in Khelo india youth games and a subsequent gold medal in the Khelo university games.

Early and personal life 
Siwi Boora was born on 15 October 1998 in rural Hisar, Haryana. Her father Mahendra Singh, a farmer, played basketball at the national level. Saweety Boora, her older sister, is the one who inspired her to start boxing.

Career 

Participated in AIBA World Championship, Bulgaria, 20–29 November 2013.
Participated in AIBA Women's Junior/Youth Boxing Championship, Taipei, Taiwan, 14–24 May 2015.
Training Tour, Russia, October 2015.
Participated in President's Cup, Kazakhstan, 4–11 June 2017.
She participated in the fourth Elite Women National Boxing Championship, Weight class- 64 kg, Kannur, Kerala, 2–8 December 2019.

References 

Indian women boxers
Living people
1998 births